Orlando in Heaven is the eighth solo studio album by guitarist Brian Tarquin, released on June 9, 2017, by Cleopatra Records. It peaked #6 on the Relix Jam Band Radio charts October 2017. All tracks were recorded at Tarquin's Jungle Room Studios in Merritt Island, Florida. Being especially moved by the Pulse Nightclub shooting in 2016, Tarquin composed and produced the songs especially for those victims. It features guest guitar icon Larry Coryell (his final recordings before his passing in 2017), vocalist Phil Naro, Grammy jazz guitarist Mike Stern, fretless bass player Tony Franklin (Jimmy Page/Blue Murder), Chris Poland (Megadeth), Hal Lindes (Dire Straits), Will Ray (The Hellecasters), jazz keyboardist Bob Baldwin (musician) & Grammy nominee Denny Jiosa. A portion of proceeds is donated to Catholic Charities of Central Florida. They provide case management and supportive services for victims and family members of the Pulse shooting in Orlando.

Track listing

Personnel
Brian Tarquin – rhythm, melody & solo guitars & bass on tracks 7 & 10 
Reggie Pryor – drums
Rick Mullen – bass (tracks 4, 6, 8)
Brandon Miller – bass (tracks 4, 6, 8)
Juan Tobon – rhodes and strings (tracks 1, 5, 7, 9, 11)
Ryan De Sade Way – rhodes and synth (tracks 2, 4, 5, 6, 8, 10 ) 
Hal Lindes – guest guitar solo  (track 1, 10 & 11)
Bob Baldwin (musician) - piano & synth (track 2 & 8)
Larry Coryell - guest guitar solo  (track 3 & 5)
Chris Poland – guest guitar solo  (track 4)
Phil Naro – vocals (tracks 1 & 3)
Mike Stern – guest guitar solo  (track 6)
Denny Jiosa – guest guitar solo  (track 6)
Will Ray – guest guitar solo  (track 7)
Tony Franklin – fretless bass (tracks 9)
Brian Tarquin – mix engineer, producer
Additional vocal recording by Frank Tassone 
David Glasser of Airshow & Geoff Gray – mastering engineers
Miss M and Brian Tarquin – graphic design

References

External links
 
 
 
 

2017 albums
Brian Tarquin albums
Cleopatra Records albums